Henning Svensson (born 19 October 1891 – 23 January 1979) was a Swedish amateur football defender who competed in the 1912 Summer Olympics. He was a member of the Swedish Olympic squad. He did not play in a match, but was a reserve player.

He played a total of 20 full international games for Sweden. He represented his country from 1912 to 1923.

He played his club football for IFK Göteborg. He managed IFK Göteborg and Falkenbergs FF.

References

External links
 
 
 list of Swedish international footballers by caps

1891 births
1979 deaths
Association football defenders
Swedish footballers
Sweden international footballers
IFK Göteborg players
Olympic footballers of Sweden
Footballers at the 1912 Summer Olympics
Swedish football managers
IFK Göteborg managers
Falkenbergs FF managers